The Anthony Road (Route B28) is a major B Route in Western Tasmania, running from the Murchison Highway (A10) at Tullah to the Zeehan Highway (A10) north of Queenstown.

It is, with the Lyell Highway, one of only two roads that run within or cross the West Coast Range.

The name is derived from the Anthony River which is located in the West Coast Range.

It is commonly used as a bypass of Rosebery for people travelling south to Queenstown and beyond or for people travelling north to Tullah and beyond.

The Anthony Road is the only road from which all major peaks of the Cradle Mountain-Lake St Clair reserve can be seen. It provides access to several classic walks: Mt Murchison, the Dora Plateau and the Tyndall Range.

It runs close to natural and man made lakes in the upper reaches of the Murchison River catchment of the Pieman River power scheme. Lakes include Lake Plimsoll, Lake Selina, and Lake Westwood.  It also goes close to the base of Mount Murchison.

It is also an access road for the Henty Gold Mine.

It runs parallel to the Henty River for the last 10 kilometres before the Zeehan Highway.

See also
 List of highways in Tasmania

Notes

External links
 https://web.archive.org/web/20070907132410/http://www.parks.tas.gov.au/wha/wherein/detail.html Map of World Heritage Area

West Coast Range
Roads in Western Tasmania